Heusser is a surname. Notable people with the surname include:

 Ed Heusser (1909–1956), American basketball player
 Felipe Heusser (born 1980), Chilean activist 
 Jakob Heusser (1862–1941), Swiss industrialist
Johanna Spyri (née Heusser) (1827-1901), Swiss-born novelist 
 Roger Heusser (born 1941), American Civil Servant

German-language surnames